Veyselkarani is a municipality (belde) in the Baykan District of Siirt Province in Turkey. The settlement is populated by Kurds of the Poran tribe and had a population of 6,094 in 2021.

The municipality is divided into the neighborhoods of Atatürk, Çay and Şeyhosman.

References 

Kurdish settlements in Siirt Province
Populated places in Siirt Province